Brewster County is a county located in the U.S. state of Texas.  It is in West Texas and its county seat (and only city) is Alpine. It is one of the nine counties that comprise the Trans-Pecos region, and borders Mexico.  Brewster County is the largest county by area in the state - at  it is over three times the size of the state of Delaware, and more than  bigger than Connecticut.

As of the 2020 census, the population was 9,546.

The county is named for Colonel Henry Percy Brewster, a Secretary of War for the Republic of Texas.

History

Native Americans
Paleo-Indian hunter-gatherers existed in the region at least 9000 years ago. Mescalaro Apaches emerged later and conducted raids that discouraged settlers. Between 1779 and 1787, Col. Juan de Ugalde drove the Mescalaros back north across the Rio Grande and into the Chisos Mountains. The three leading Mescalero chiefs, Patula Grande, Quemado, and Zapato Tuerto, agreed in March 1789 to submit to Spanish rule. Comanche raiding parties continued through much of the 19th century.

Early explorations

Spanish explorers Álvar Núñez Cabeza de Vaca in 1535 and Antonio de Espejo in 1583 crossed Brewster County on their way to La Junta de los Ríos, the junction of the Rio Grande and the Rio Conchos.

In 1684, Juan Domínguez de Mendoza camped at Kokernot Spring and wrote the earliest recorded description of it.

Pedro de Rábago y Terán, Governor of Coahuila in the 1740s, led an expedition to La Junta de los Ríos.

Northern Mexican military governor Lt. Col. Hugo Oconór led a 1772 expedition to locate sites for forts on the Comanche Trail along the Rio Grande.

In October 1851, Danish-born Col. Edvard Emil Langberg, Mexican commandant of Chihuahua, visited southern Brewster County.

Surveyor William H. Emory in 1852 sent M. T. W. Chandler to survey what is now the heart of Big Bend National Park. Chandler explored Santa Elena Canyon, the Chisos Mountains Mariscal Canyon, and Boquillas Canyon.

An 1859 expedition of the U.S. Camel Corps under 2d Lt. Edward L. Hartz  explored the Comanche Trail through Persimmon Gap and down Tornillo Creek to the Rio Grande. A year later, a second camel expedition under 2d Lt. William Echols also explored along the Rio Grande.

County established and growth

Brewster County was marked off in 1887 from Presidio County and named for Henry Percy Brewster. Murphyville, later renamed Alpine, was selected as county seat.

In response to threats of ongoing Indian attacks, Camp Peña Colorado was established in 1879 a few miles south of the future site of Marathon.

Word of mouth about the open rangeland in the area was spread by freighters John W Burgess and August Santleben, leading the way for settlers.

The Galveston, Harrisburg and San Antonio Railway built through the area in 1882, opening up opportunity for entrepreneurs who came on railroad-related business and stayed.

Alfred S. Gage moved to the area in 1882 to help his brother's ranching operation, founding the A. S. Gage Ranch, one of the largest ranching operations in Texas, in 1883.  In 1927, he built the Gage Hotel in Marathon.

Legendary lawman and later Texas Rangers Hall of Fame member James B. Gillett served as sheriff of Brewster County, and operated a ranch in Alpine in the late 19th and early 20th centuries. He later retired to his Barrel Spring Ranch in Jeff Davis County.

Joseph Daniel Jackson  came to the area in 1882 as part of Company B of the Texas Rangers assigned to protect the railroad. By 1882, he had settled near Alpine and taken up ranching, branching out later to become a merchant and civic leader. Jackson is known locally as the father of Sul Ross University due to his efforts that helped lead to the establishment of the school.  Sul Ross University, named for Texas Governor Lawrence Sullivan Ross, was created by an act of the 35th Legislature in 1917 as a state normal college to train teachers.

Population boom
The population grew from 710 in 1890 to 5,220 in 1910 due for the most part to industries that relied on natural resources.

From the turn of the 20th century through World War II, the Terlingua Mining District, west of the Chisos Mountains, was a boom town due to the extraction of cinnabar, a mercury ore. Silver and lead from mines on the Mexican side of the river in the Boquillas area were shipped north, as were candelilla wax produced at factories at Glenn Spring and Mariscal, and the guayule rubber from a factory in Marathon.

Pancho Villa and banditos
Brewster County became targeted by incursions of bandits from Mexico, inspired at least in part by Pancho Villa. In June 1915, Governor James E. Ferguson asked President Woodrow Wilson to station troops in the Big Bend. The request was denied by Maj. Gen. Frederick Funston, who believed such security was a state issue. Although a number of events took place to effect policy change, the tipping point was the May 5, 1916 raid at Glenn Spring. Only nine soldiers had been stationed in the area for protection against the bandits. Estimates vary as to the number of Mexican raiders who attacked the soldiers, from 60 to several hundred. The raid caused a larger military presence in the area. President Wilson mobilized the National Guard to reinforce the Army, and by the end of 1916, an estimated 116,957 guardsmen were stationed along the border from California to Texas. As the mines and wax factories played out after World War I, raids from across the border abated.

During the 1918 influenza epidemic, an African American nurse living in the border area of Brewster County, Viola Pettus, became legendary for her courageous and selfless treatment of anyone with the disease – including raiders and refugees from Mexico, and local members of the Ku Klux Klan.

Big Bend
The geographic region known as the Big Bend is a loosely defined section of the Trans-Pecos, although generally agreed to comprise its more southern portions. Characterized by an extremely rugged, arid Chihuahuan Desert landscape, the region takes its name from the sharp northeastward turn made by the Rio Grande nearby. Often noted for its stark beauty, the Big Bend was described by the historian Walter Prescott Webb as "the finest example of earth-wreckage in Texas". It was for this reason that a national park was to be established in the region.

Big Bend National Park was established as a state park in 1933 by the state legislature, and expanded the same year by Governor Miriam A. Ferguson. In 1935, the United States Congress passed legislation founding it as a national park.  Big Bend opened to the public in 1944. At just over 800,000 acres, it is the fourteenth largest national park in the United States and is larger than the state of Rhode Island.

Terlingua Chili Cookoffs
Terlingua produced 40% of the nation's quicksilver in 1920, but declining population has since qualified it as a ghost town.  In 1962, The Dallas Morning News columnist Francis X. Tolbert published his ode to chili Bowl of Red and founded the Chili Appreciation Society. Fellow columnist Wick Fowler joined in the fun and became a charter member. The World Championship Chili Cookoff at Terlingua began as a tongue-in-cheek challenge between Fowler and humorist H. Allen Smith in 1967 and has become a November tradition, celebrated across the state and nation. On the first Saturday in November Terlingua now hosts two competing international chili championships: the Terlingua International Chili Championship, and the Original Terlingua International Chili Cookoff.

Geography
It is the largest county in Texas by area. The only substantial water is half the width of the Rio Grande.

The county's area is larger than the combined area of Delaware and Rhode Island, and larger than area of the individual states Connecticut, Delaware, and Rhode Island.

The Roadian Age of the Permian Period of geological time is named for rock strata in Road Canyon in the northern part of the county.

The Wordian Age of the Permian Period is probably named for the Word Ranch in the Glass Mountains, also in the northern part.

Adjacent counties and municipalities

 Pecos County (north)
 Terrell County (east)
 Acuña, Coahuila, Mexico (southeast and south)
 Ocampo, Coahuila, Mexico (south)
 Manuel Benavides, Chihuahua, Mexico (southwest)
 Presidio County (west)
 Jeff Davis County (northwest)

National protected areas
 Big Bend National Park
 Rio Grande Wild and Scenic River (part)

Major highways
  U.S. Highway 67
  U.S. Highway 90
  U.S. Highway 385
  State Highway 118

U.S. Highway 90 crosses the county in the north; U.S. Highway 385 enters Brewster County from the northeast and proceeds south to the county's main attraction, Big Bend National Park, part of the Big Bend.  The Sunset Route of the Union Pacific Railroad crosses northern parts of the county, and a recently revived portion of the Kansas City, Mexico and Orient Railway traverses the county en route to Presidio.

Climate

About 39.4% of Brewster County is classified as having a hot arid desert climate (Köppen BWh). The remainder has a semiarid steppe climate with 32.1% experiencing a cold steppe climate (Köppen BSk), while 28.5% is assigned as a hot steppe climate (Köppen BSh). Temperatures are coolest and rainfall most abundant in the county's northern highlands and in the upper elevations of the Chisos Mountains in the south. In the southern lowlands along the Rio Grande, snowfall is uncommon, rainfall much reduced, and summer high temperatures can be extreme. Throughout the county, precipitation falls mostly from May through October with the remainder of the year predominantly dry.
Alpine

 Coordinates: 
 Elevation: 

Castolon

 Coordinates: 
 Elevation: 

Chisos Basin

 Coordinates: 
 Elevation: 

Lajitas

 Coordinates: 
 Elevation: 

Marathon

 Coordinates: 
 Elevation: 

Panther Junction

 Coordinates: 
 Elevation: 

Persimmon Gap

 Coordinates: 
 Elevation: 

Study Butte

 Coordinates: 
 Elevation: 

Terlingua Ranch
 Coordinates: 
 Elevation:

Demographics

As of the 2020 United States census, there were 9,546 people, 4,292 households, and 2,300 families residing in the county. As of the 2015 Texas population estimate program, the population of the county was 9,152: non-Hispanic whites, 4,934 (53.9%);
non-Hispanic blacks, 76 (0.8%); other non-Hispanics, 261 (2.9%); and Hispanics and Latinos (of any race), 3,881 (42.4%). Per the prior 2010 United States census,  9,232 people resided in the county; 86.6% were White, 1.1% Black or African American, 1.1% Native American, 0.7% Asian, 0.1% Pacific Islander, 7.6% of some other race and 2.8% of two or more races. About 42.4% were Hispanic or Latino (of any race).

Education

These school districts serve Brewster County:
 Alpine Independent School District (Alpine High School)
 Marathon Independent School District
 San Vicente Independent School District (K-8 only) (high schoolers attend Terlingua CSD)
 Terlingua Common School District (Big Bend High School)

In addition, Sul Ross State University is located in Alpine.

Brewster County is within the Odessa College District for community college.

Communities

City
 Alpine (county seat)

Census-designated places
 Marathon
 Study Butte
 Terlingua

Unincorporated communities

 Altuda
 Arick Village
 Boquillas
 Lajitas
 Panther Junction
 Rosenfeld
 Tesnus

Ghost Towns
 Castolon
 Glenn Springs
 Haymond
 Hovey
 McKinney Springs
 San Vicente
 Toronto

County Sheriff's Office
 Alpine is the headquarters of the Brewster County Sheriff's Office. The current elected Sheriff is Ronny Dodson. The County Sheriff's Office conducts patrols and criminal investigations across the county including the incorporated City of Alpine.

Media
In 1985, there was a daily subscription of, in the county: 483 for the San Angelo Standard Times, 1.1% of its total circulation; and 270 for the Odessa American, making up 0.7% of its total circulation.

In 1985, KVLF-AM, in Alpine, was the only radio station licensed in Brewster County. An individual quoted in a Federal Communications Report stated that in daylight hours it was possible to get radio from Fort Stockton, Texas.

Politics
Despite its substantial Hispanic population, Brewster County is Republican leaning in presidential elections, though not as strongly Republican as other rural counties in the Trans-Pecos region or West Texas. No candidate has won the county with double digit margins since George W. Bush in 2000, and the last non-Republican candidate (as of 2020) to win the county was Barack Obama in 2008. However, unlike the rest of southern Texas, the county swung towards Biden in the 2020 election, albeit by less than one percent with both candidates gaining in vote percentage.

In literature
Brewster County appears in the poem by Campbell McGrath, "Sunset, Route 90, Brewster County, Texas," featured in his book American Noise.

See also

 Chalk Mountains
 List of museums in West Texas
 National Register of Historic Places listings in Brewster County, Texas
 Recorded Texas Historic Landmarks in Brewster County
 USS Brewster County (LST-483)
 Buchel County, Texas
 Foley County, Texas
 Post Park

References

Further reading

External links

 Brewster County official website
 
 Brewster County from the  Texas Almanac
 Brewster County from the TXGenWeb Project
 Brewster County Historical Commission
 Texas Beyond History, Candelilla Wax Camps
 West Texas Weekly - a local weekly newspaper

 
1887 establishments in Texas
Populated places established in 1887
Trans-Pecos